Kim Jung-min (born 13 February 1972) is a South Korean basketball player. She competed in the women's tournament at the 1996 Summer Olympics.

References

1972 births
Living people
South Korean women's basketball players
Olympic basketball players of South Korea
Basketball players at the 1996 Summer Olympics